Dany Gilbert Kiti "Touki" Toussaint (born June 20, 1996) is a Haitian-American professional baseball pitcher in the Cleveland Guardians organization. He was drafted by the Arizona Diamondbacks in the first round of the 2014 Major League Baseball draft. He made his MLB debut with the Atlanta Braves in 2018 and has also played for the Los Angeles Angels.

Amateur career
Toussaint was born in Pembroke Pines, Florida, to Dany Toussaint and Kahaso Kiti. He is of Haitian and Kenyan descent, and has an elder sister, Garielle. Toussaint's nickname, Touki, is a portmanteau of his parents' surnames. The family moved to Haiti when he was three months old. Toussaint and his mother moved back to Florida when he was six. He stopped playing baseball at age 10 due to a strikeout-filled season as a batter, and focused on soccer and hockey only to return to baseball two years later, following a bet with a friend.

Toussaint attended Coral Springs Charter School for his freshman year  before transferring to Coral Springs Christian Academy also in Coral Springs, Florida. As a junior in 2013, Toussaint was a MaxPreps All-American after he was 6–2 with a 0.78 earned run average (ERA) and 83 strikeouts. He also hit .458 with six home runs and 32 runs batted in. He was named Broward County's Class 5A-4A-3A-2A Player of the Year. Toussaint committed to play college baseball at Vanderbilt University.

Professional career

Arizona Diamondbacks
Toussaint was considered one of the top prospects for the 2014 MLB draft. The Arizona Diamondbacks selected Toussaint in the first round, 16th overall, of the draft. He signed on June 20, agreeing to a $2.7 million signing bonus, and made his professional debut with the Arizona League Diamondbacks on July 2. On August 3, he was promoted to the Missoula Osprey. Toussaint pitched his first Pioneer League game on August 8, 2014.

Toussaint finished his first professional season with a 2–4 record and an 8.48 ERA over 12 total appearances. Toussaint began the 2015 season at extended spring training, then joined the Kane County Cougars in May.

Atlanta Braves
On June 20, 2015, the Diamondbacks traded Touissant to the Atlanta Braves along with Bronson Arroyo for Phil Gosselin. He finished the 2015 season with a 4.83 ERA in 17 total starts, including a 5.73 ERA over ten starts as a member of the Rome Braves. The rocky season was attributed to the Diamondbacks' request Toussaint cut down on the use of his curveball, shortly after his debut with Kane County, as the team felt becoming excessively reliant on the pitch early in his career would lead to injury. Not throwing his curveball gave Toussaint time to improve his changeup, which became a viable third pitch over the course of the season. Toussaint spent 2016 with Rome. He struggled to begin the season, but improved after making adjustments to his pitching delivery.

Toussaint began 2017 with the Florida Fire Frogs and was promoted to the Mississippi Braves in late July 2017, making his Southern League debut on July 31 against the Mobile BayBears. In 145 total innings pitched between Florida and Mississippi, he pitched to a 6–13 record with a 4.53 ERA along with 167 strikeouts. He appeared in the offseason Arizona Fall League with the Peoria Javelinas. Toussaint started the 2018 season in Mississippi, recording a 2.93 ERA with 107 strikeouts until a midseason promotion to the Gwinnett Stripers. Toussaint faced the Norfolk Tides in his first International League game on July 5, 2018, pitching  innings while yielding one run on five hits. He was named to the All-Star Futures Game, and appeared in relief to pitch the eighth inning.

On August 13, 2018, the Braves purchased Toussaint's contract and added him to the roster. He made his MLB debut the same day with a start against the Miami Marlins, yielding one run on two hits in six innings pitched. Toussaint spent time at spring training prior to the start of the 2019 season, and began the year at Gwinnett.

On July 4, 2020, it was announced Toussaint had tested positive for COVID-19. In 2020, he was 0–2 with an 8.88 ERA over 24.1 innings.

On March 27, 2021, Toussaint was placed on the 60-day injured list with a strain in his throwing shoulder. He was activated from the injured list on July 16. In 2021 for the Braves he was 3-3 with a 4.50 ERA. The Braves finished with an 88–73 record, clinching the NL East, and eventually won the 2021 World Series, giving the Braves their first title since 1995.

The Braves designated Toussaint for assignment on July 2, 2022.

Los Angeles Angels
On July 3, 2022, the Los Angeles Angels acquired Toussaint from the Atlanta Braves for cash considerations. Toussaint appeared in eight major league games for the Angels, including two starts with a 1–1 record and a 4.62 ERA. On November 18, Toussaint was non tendered and became a free agent.

Cleveland Guardians
On January 4, 2023, Toussaint signed a minor league contract with the Cleveland Guardians. The deal includes an invitation to the Guardians' 2023 major league spring training camp.

References

External links

1996 births
Living people
African-American baseball players
American people of Kenyan descent
American sportspeople of Haitian descent
Arizona League Diamondbacks players
Atlanta Braves players
Baseball players from Florida
Florida Fire Frogs players
Gwinnett Stripers players
Haitian baseball players
Haitian people of Kenyan descent
Kane County Cougars players
Los Angeles Angels players
Major League Baseball pitchers
Mississippi Braves players
Missoula Osprey players
People from Pembroke Pines, Florida
Peoria Javelinas players
Rome Braves players
21st-century African-American sportspeople